Events in the year 1920 in Japan.  It corresponds to Taishō 9 (大正9年) in the Japanese calendar.

Incumbents
Emperor: Taishō
Prime Minister: Hara Takashi

Governors
Aichi Prefecture: Shunji Miyao
Akita Prefecture: Ryoshin Nao 
Aomori Prefecture: Hidehiko Michioka 
Ehime Prefecture: Toshio Mawatari 
Fukui Prefecture: Kohei Yuji 
Fukuoka Prefecture: Yasukouchi Asakichi 
Fukushima Prefecture: Miyata Mitsuo
Gifu Prefecture: Kanokogi Kogoro 
Gunma Prefecture: Muneyoshi Oshiba 
Hiroshima Prefecture: Raizo Wakabayashi 
Ibaraki Prefecture: Yuichiro Chikaraishi 
Iwate Prefecture: Takeo Kakinuma 
Kagawa Prefecture: Yoshibumi Satake 
Kochi Prefecture: Abe Yoshihiko 
Kumamoto Prefecture: Hikoji Kawaguchi 
Kyoto Prefecture: Eitaro Mabuchi 
Mie Prefecture: Haruki Yamawaki 
Miyagi Prefecture: Mori Masataka 
Miyazaki Prefecture: Naomiki Hirose 
Nagano Prefecture: Tenta Akaboshi 
Niigata Prefecture: Ota Masahiro 
Okayama Prefecture: Masao Kishimoto
Okinawa Prefecture: Sōsuke Kawagoe 
Saga Prefecture: Sawada Ushimaro 
Saitama Prefecture: Horiuchi Hidetaro 
Shiname Prefecture: Sanehide Takarabe 
Tochigi Prefecture: Hiroyoshi Hiratsuka 
Tokushima Prefecture: Rinpei Otsu
Tokyo: Hiroshi Abe 
Toyama Prefecture: Higashizono Motomitsu 
Yamagata Prefecture: Ichiro Yoda
Yamanashi Prefecture: Miki Nagano

Events
January 10 – Japan is a founding member of the League of Nations.
January 30 – Mazda founded, as predecessor name was Toyo Cork Industry.
February Unknown date – Kawanishi Engineering Works, as predecessor of ShinMaywa, is founded in Hyogo-ku, Kobe.
February 1 – Japanese sugar plantation workers in Hawaii officially join a strike led by Filipinos and Hispanic workers.
February 24 – Nikolayevsk Incident: Realizing that he is outnumbered and far from reinforcement, the commander of the Japanese garrison allowed Yakov Triapitsyn's troops to enter the town of Nikolayevsk-on-Amur under a flag of truce.
May 10 – In the general election, the Rikken Seiyūkai, led by Prime Minister Hara Takashi, increases on its majority of seats in the lower house of the Diet.
June - About 450 Japanese civilians and 350 Japanese soldiers, along with Russian White Army supporters, are massacred by partisan forces associated with the Red Army at Nikolayevsk on the Amur River.
June Unknown date – Shikishima Bakery was founded in Nagoya, as predecessor of Pasco Shikishima.
September 1 – Rinnai was founded in Nagoya.
September 17 – The Victory Medal, a commemorative military medal of Japan awarded to mark service during the First World War, is established by Imperial Edict.
October 21 – The Battle of Qingshanli begins between the Imperial Japanese Army and Korean armed groups in a densely wooded region of eastern Manchuria called Qīngshānlǐ. 
December 16 – Bank of Yokohama was founded, as predecessor name was Yokohama Kōshō Bank (横浜興商銀行) in Kanagawa Prefecture.   
date unknown
The literary magazine Teikoku Bungaku is published for the last time.
The Guards Cavalry Regiment, Guards Field Artillery Regiment, Guards Engineer Battalion, Guards Transport Battalion, plus other Guards service units are added to the Japanese Imperial Guard.

Births
January 23 – Nejiko Suwa, violinist (d. 2012)
January 30 – Machiko Hasegawa, Illustrator (d. 1992)
February 12 – Yoshiko Yamaguchi, singer, actress, journalist, and politician (d. 2014)
March 17 – Takeo Doi, academic, psychoanalyst and author (d. 2009)
March 22 – Katsuko Saruhashi, geochemist (d. 2007)
April 1 – Toshiro Mifune, actor (d. 1997)
May 9 – Mitsuko Mori, actress (d. 2012)
May 30 – Shōtarō Yasuoka, writer (d. 2013)
June 17 – Setsuko Hara, actress (d. 2015)
July 15 – Yoshio Inaba, actor (d. 1998)
October 20 – Masao Sugiuchi, go player (d. 2017)
December 24 – Hiroyuki Agawa, writer (d. 2015)

Deaths
January 10 – Yoshikawa Akimasa, politician and  cabinet minister (b. 1842)
January 11 – Kataoka Shichirō, admiral (b. 1854)
April 12 – Takaki Kanehiro, naval physician (b. 1849)
April 27 – Tadashi Satō, soldier and politician (b. 1849)
September 20 – Shō Ten, last Ryūkyū crown prince, member of the House of Peers (b. 1864)
October 5 – Suematsu Kenchō, politician and author (b. 1855)
October 6 – Kuroiwa Shūroku, journalist and writer (b. 1864)

References

 
1920s in Japan
Japan